Ten Winters is a 2009 Italian romance film directed by Valerio Mieli. It is based on the novel with the same title written by Mieli himself. The film premiered at the 2009 Venice Film Festival.  For this film Mieli won the David di Donatello for Best New Director and the Nastro d'Argento in the same category.

Cast 
Isabella Ragonese: Camilla
Michele Riondino: Silvestro
Glen Blackhall: Simone
Sergey Zhigunov: Fjodor
Sergei Nikonenko: professor 
Ljuba Zaiceva: Ljuba
Vinicio Capossela: singer
Sara Lazzaro: Maria Antonietta
Alice Torriani: Clara

References

External links

2009 films
2009 romance films
Italian romance films
Films based on Italian novels
2009 directorial debut films
2000s Italian-language films
2000s Italian films